Gruppo Sportivo Porto Robur Costa, or simply Porto Robur Costa, is an Italian men's volleyball club based in Ravenna. The club also known as Bunge Ravenna for sponsorship reasons, participates in the Serie A1 championship.

History
Porto Robur Costa was founded in the summer of 2013 by the merging of two Ravenna-based clubs, Porto Ravenna Volley and Gruppo Sportivo Robur Angelo Costa. Porto Robur Costa made its debut in Serie A1 in the 2013–14 season, in which, after finished the regular season in ninth place, it won the CEV Challenge Cup play-offs, obtaining the right to participate in the competition of the same name under the name CMC Ravenna. The same situation also occurs in the 2016–17 season, qualifying for the 2017–18 CEV Challenge Cup.

Honours

European competitions
 CEV Challenge Cup
 Winners (1): 2017-18

Team

References

External links
 

Italian volleyball clubs
Volleyball clubs established in 2013
2013 establishments in Italy
Ravenna